Events from the year 1602 in France

Incumbents
 Monarch – Henry IV

Events

Births
10 August – Gilles de Roberval, mathematician (died 1675)

Full date missing
Charles Raymbault, Jesuit missionary (died 1643)
Françoise-Marie Jacquelin (died 1645)

Deaths
 
14 September – Jean Passerat, political satirist and poet (born 1534)
30 October – Jean-Jacques Boissard, poet (born 1528)
22 November – Toussaint Dubreuil, painter (born c.1561)

Full date missing
Charles de Gontaut, duc de Biron, soldier (born 1562)
Daniel Tossanus, theologian (born 1541)

See also

References

1600s in France